Li Jinzhe (simplified Chinese: 李金哲; born 1 September 1989) is a Chinese track and field athlete who specialises in the long jump. His personal best is 8.47 metres, set in 2014. This gives him the Chinese record long jump.

He was the 2009 Asian Champion in the event and represented China at the 2009 World Championships in Athletics. He became regional champion for a second time at the 2012 Asian Indoor Athletics Championships and made his Olympic debut at the 2012 Summer Olympics later that year.

Career
Born in Beijing, Li began competing in 2007 and was runner-up behind Su Xiongfeng at that year's Chinese City Games – the country's foremost junior competition. He gained his first international medal (a bronze) at the 2008 Asian Junior Athletics Championships. He cleared eight metres for the first time at the 2009 Chinese Championships in May, where his jump of 8.08 m brought him his first national title.

Li was selected to represent China in the long jump at the 2009 World Championships in Athletics and narrowly missed out on qualification into the final. At the 11th Chinese National Games in October he set a personal best of 8.18 m and came second behind Zhang Xiaoyi. He remained in good form, jumping 8.16 m the following month to win at the 2009 Asian Athletics Championships. He continued competing into mid-December and built upon his Asian title with a gold medal at the 2009 East Asian Games.

He featured indoors in Germany at the start of 2010, setting an indoor best of 7.98 m for second place behind Salim Sdiri at the BW-Bank Meeting and then turning the tables on the Frenchman to win at the Sparkassen Cup. He attended the 2010 IAAF World Indoor Championships in Doha, but failed to make it past the qualifying round. In the outdoor season he placed top three at the Prefontaine Classic and the Rieti Meeting on the athletics circuit. Li attempted to defend his national long jump title at the Chinese Championships in August, but was beaten into second by Su Xiongfeng. He ended the year with a fourth-place finish at the 2010 IAAF Continental Cup, representing the Asia-Pacific team.

Li took another victory at the Sparkassen Cup in January 2011, defeating Sdiri and Dwight Phillips. His best jump that year (8.02 m) came early in the season in Fuzhou that June. His performances were lower than in previous years and he did not defend his title at the 2011 Asian Athletics Championships, managing only fifth place. He performed better the year after, taking the gold at the 2012 Asian Indoor Athletics Championships and winning all but one of his outings on the Chinese and Asian Grand Prix circuits. He cleared 8.25 m in Wuhan. He was chosen for the Chinese team for the 2012 London Olympics and competed in the qualifying rounds only.

An indoor best of 8.11 m came at the start of 2013, when he took third at the XL Galan meet in Stockholm. Li jumped a new personal best of 8.34 m at the 2013 Shanghai Golden Grand Prix, defeating a quality field including the last three Olympic champions (Phillips, Irving Saladino and Greg Rutherford) as well as Mitchell Watt and Aleksandr Menkov. He won his hometown meet, the inaugural IAAF World Challenge Beijing at the Bird's Nest Stadium, a few days later with a mark of 8.31 m.

Competition record

References

External links

Living people
1989 births
Chinese male long jumpers
Athletes from Beijing
Olympic athletes of China
Athletes (track and field) at the 2012 Summer Olympics
Asian Games gold medalists for China
Asian Games medalists in athletics (track and field)
Athletes (track and field) at the 2014 Asian Games
Athletes (track and field) at the 2010 Asian Games
World Athletics Championships athletes for China
Medalists at the 2014 Asian Games
21st-century Chinese people